Mia Riverton is an American film actress and producer, best known for her role in the 2005 film Red Doors.

Personal life

Riverton was born Esther Tonia Riggin in Columbus, Ohio in 1978. Her mother, Alice Riggin, is an immigrant from Taiwan, and her father, Ralph Riggin, is of Irish and Cherokee descent. She has a younger brother, Daniel.

She grew up in Carmel, Indiana, where she attended the Park Tudor School. In 1999, she graduated cum laude and Phi Beta Kappa from Harvard University.

In 2007, she married David Alpert at a beach wedding in Fiji.

Career
Her work includes producing and starring in the 2006 film Red Doors. A singer as well, Riverton has performed at Carnegie Hall.  She was also in the 2003 film 13 Dead Men.

Filmography
Spare Parts (2015)
Open House (2010)
Red Doors (2005)
13 Dead Men (2003)

References

External links
Mia Riverton, official cast profile
Mia Riverton at the IMDb

American actresses of Taiwanese descent
American people of Irish descent
American people of Cherokee descent
American film actresses
Living people
Harvard University alumni
1978 births
People from Carmel, Indiana
21st-century American women